The 1967 British League season was the 33rd season of the top tier of speedway in the United Kingdom and the third season known as the British League.

Summary
The league was made up of the same 19 teams that competed in the previous year. Swindon Robins led by the world champion Barry Briggs won their first top tier league title but were pushed all the way by Coventry Bees and West Ham Hammers. Swindon finished with four riders with averages over eight, Briggs topped the entire league with 11.05 but the contributions from Martin Ashby (8.83), Bob Kilby (8.61) and Mike Broadbank (8.55) were pivotal in the Swindon's success. Coventry Bees gained some consolation for finishing runner-up two seasons running by winning the Knockout Cup.

Final table
M = Matches; W = Wins; D = Draws; L = Losses; Pts = Total Points

Knockout Cup
The cup was won by Coventry Bees.

Final leading averages

Riders & final averages
Belle Vue

 9.65
 9.03
 8.32
 7.83
 6.42
 5.89
 3.56
 3.31
 2.75
 2.72
 2.60
 2.55

Coventry

 10.52
 8.97
 8.66
 6.33
 6.25
 4.89
 4.08
 3.23

Cradley

 7.54
 7.34
 7.32
 7.04
 6.37
 6.04
 5.67
 3.76
 3.39
 3.16
 2.60

Edinburgh

 9.19 
 8.99 
 8.13
 6.50
 6.46
 5.84
 5.31
 5.14
 3.56

Exeter

 8.21 
 7.83
 7.38
 7.25 
 6.78
 6.66
 6.57
 6.42
 5.55
 3.90
 3.28

Glasgow

 10.50 
 6.90 
 6.47
 6.41
 6.36
 5.98
 5.40
 4.68
 4.00
 3.80
 3.07

Hackney

 9.87
 8.95 
 6.25
 5.82
 5.33
 5.05
 4.97
 4.66

Halifax

 10.29
 9.12 
 8.42
 6.00
 4.78
 4.76
 4.34
 4.14
 2.75

King's Lynn

 9.74 
 7.95 
 6.27
 6.05
 (Kid Bodie) 5.72
 4.39
 4.00
 3.39
 2.73
 2.73

Long Eaton

 10.43
 8.74
 7.10
 5.77
 4.82
 3.97
 2.92
 2.72

Newcastle

 9.32
 7.54
 6.10
 6.04
 6.00
 5.98
 5.93
 5.63 
 1.65

Newport

 10.05
 8.27 
 6.63
 6.29
 6.08
 4.76
 4.24

Oxford

 9.57
 9.37
 8.29 
 7.51 
 6.06
 4.95
 4.68
 4.00
 2.40

Poole

 9.99
 8.25
 8.00
 6.29
 5.91
 4.94
 4.68

Sheffield

 7.08
 7.04
 6.97
 6.65 
 6.22
 6.02
 5.82
 5.45
 3.78

Swindon

 11.05
 8.83
 8.61
 8.55
 4.46
 4.41
 4.25

West Ham

 10.25
 9.53
 7.54
 7.09
 7.03
 4.76
 4.46
 4.36
 0.80

Wimbledon

 9.52
 8.49
 8.23
 6.00
J 5.86
 5.23
 4.56
 3.19
 2.06

Wolverhampton

 9.29
 9.08
 8.21
 7.92
 5.56
 5.04
 4.72
 1.95

See also
List of United Kingdom Speedway League Champions
Knockout Cup (speedway)

References

British League
1967 in British motorsport
1967 in speedway